Inquisitor intertinctus is a species of sea snail, a marine gastropod mollusk in the family Pseudomelatomidae, the turrids and allies.

Description
The length of the shell varies from 20 mm to 40 mm.

This species seems to be somewhat variable in sculpture and colour. The spiral lirae of the penultimate whorl vary in number from 3 to 5. In other specimens not only the infrasutural keel is adorned with red-brown dots, but also the principal lirae on many places.

Distribution
This marine species occurs off the Philippines, and west to the Gulf of Thailand and Andaman Islands; off the Northern Territories, Australia.

References

 Smith, E.A. (1877) Diagnoses of new species of Pleurotomidae in the British Museum. Annals and Magazine of Natural History, series 4, 19, 488–501
 Liu J.Y. [Ruiyu] (ed.). (2008). Checklist of marine biota of China seas. China Science Press. 1267 pp.

External links
  Baoquan Li 李宝泉 & R.N. Kilburn, Report on Crassispirinae Morrison, 1966 (Mollusca: Neogastropoda: Turridae) from the China Seas; Journal of Natural History 44(11):699-740 · March 2010; DOI: 10.1080/00222930903470086
 Gastropods.com: Inquisitor intertincta
 

intertinctus
Gastropods described in 1877